The Women's Points Race is one of the 9 women's events at the 2010 UCI Track Cycling World Championships, held in Ballerup, Denmark.

24 Cyclists participated in the contest. The Final was held on 28 March.

Results

References

Women's Points Race Results tissottiming.com

Women's points race
UCI Track Cycling World Championships – Women's points race